Vasilijus Matuševas (18 October 1945 – 24 October 1989) was a Lithuanian former volleyball player who competed for the Soviet Union in the 1968 Summer Olympics.

He was born in Žagarinė, Ignalina district municipality.

In 1968, he was part of the Soviet team which won the gold medal in the Olympic tournament. He played two matches.

External links
 

1945 births
1989 deaths
People from Ignalina District Municipality
Lithuanian men's volleyball players
Soviet men's volleyball players
Olympic volleyball players of the Soviet Union
Volleyball players at the 1968 Summer Olympics
Olympic gold medalists for the Soviet Union
Olympic medalists in volleyball
Medalists at the 1968 Summer Olympics